John Morales may refer to:

John Morales (meteorologist), American meteorologist
John Moráles (born 1939), former Puerto Rican basketball player
John Morales, American music producer member of Morales and Munzibai